Affleck is a Scottish surname.

Affleck may also refer to:
 Affleck, Aberdeenshire, a rural area in the hamlet of Whiterashes, Scotland
Affleck, the Scots pronunciation of Auchinleck, a village in Ayrshire, Scotland
 Affleck baronets, baronetage of Great Britain
 Affleck Canal, inlet in Alaska
 Affleck Castle, a tower house in Angus, Scotland
 Affleck House, a house in Michigan designed by Frank Lloyd Wright
 HMS Affleck (K462), a World War II frigate named after Sir Edmund Affleck

See also

Afflecks, a shopping complex in Manchester, Greater Manchester